Look Out for #1  is the debut album by the Los Angeles, California-based duo Brothers Johnson released in 1976. The album reached number one on the R&B albums chart and number three on the jazz albums chart in the United States.

Track listing
All tracks composed by George and Louis Johnson; except where indicated
"I'll Be Good to You" (George Johnson, Louis Johnson, Sonora Sam)	4:44 	
"Thunder Thumbs And Lightnin' Licks" (Instrumental) (Dave Grusin, George Johnson, Louis Johnson, Paul Riser)	4:51 	
"Get The Funk Out Ma Face" (George Johnson, Louis Johnson, Quincy Jones)	2:27 	
"Tomorrow" (Instrumental)	2:58 	
"Free and Single" 	4:07 	
"Come Together" (John Lennon, Paul McCartney)	4:12 	
"Land of Ladies"  4:30 	
"Dancin' and Prancin'" 	3:01 	
"The Devil" 	3:40

Personnel
George Johnson - Lead Guitar, Lead and Backing Vocals
Louis Johnson - Guitar, Bass, Lead Vocals and Backing Vocals
Dave Grusin - Acoustic Piano, Electric Piano, Synthesizer
Don Lewis - Keyboards (Armand Pascettas Polyphonic Synthesized Keyboard System)
Harvey Mason - Drums, Percussion
Ian Underwood - Synthesizer 
Toots Thielemans - Harmonica
Ralph MacDonald - Percussion
Billy Cobham - Timbales
Ernie Watts, Sahib Shihab, Terry Harrington - Saxophone, Flute
Bill Lamb, Chuck Findley - Trumpet
Glenn Ferris - Trombone
Jesse Kirkland, Jim Gilstrap, Pepper Swinson, Syreeta Wright - Background vocals
Lee Ritenour - Guitar on "Land of Ladies"
Paul Riser - Horn arrangements
Technical
Chris Brent, Peter Chaikin, Phil Schier - engineer, mixing
Roland Young - art direction
Elliot Gilbert - photography

Charts and certifications

Charts

Singles

Certifications

External links
 Brothers Johnson-Look Out For #1 at Discogs

References

 

1976 debut albums
The Brothers Johnson albums
A&M Records albums
Albums arranged by Quincy Jones
Albums produced by Quincy Jones